"Helwa ya baladi" ("Oh Sweet, My Homeland") is an Egyptian Arabic song by Dalida from 1979, enjoying great popularity in the Middle East and the Arab diaspora. The song is an homage to Egypt, Dalida's birthplace, and is considered representative of the nationalistic pride felt by many Egyptians.

It was sung by tens to hundreds of thousands of Egyptians who demonstrated in Tahrir Square during the Egyptian Revolution of 2011.

Background and significance

The song is composed in the key of C minor, although the chorus is in F minor. It is the second song in Arabic language for Dalida after her hit "Salma Ya Salama". Dalida sang it during French television broadcasts.

Versions
The song was also registered in French as "" in 1981, in Spanish (despite the Italian title) as "" in 1984 and remixed in Spanish for the album  in 1998.

The song has been covered many times notably by French-Israeli singer Ishtar in 2005 in the album  in Arabic and Spanish. It was also recorded by the Lebanese singer Elissa in 2014 in her album Halet Hob.

References

Dalida songs
Egyptian songs
1979 songs
Patriotic songs